The 2016–17 Indian cricket season was the 124th cricket season since the commencement of first-class cricket in India. The season started early in September 2016 and lasted up to March 2017. The season included tours from New Zealand, England, West Indies women, England U-19, Bangladesh and Australia. India also played host to a bilateral series between Afghanistan and Ireland.

Squads

Men's Squad 
Following 34 cricketers, listed alphabetically, featured in at-least 1 match among the 24 international matches played in India during the season.

Women's squad

September

New Zealand in India

November

England in India

West Indies Women in India

January

Irani Cup

England U-19 in India

February

Bangladesh in India

Australia in India

March

Ireland vs. Afghanistan in India

References 

Indian cricket seasons from 2000–01
2016 in Indian cricket
2017 in Indian cricket